The Freeride World Tour (FWT) is an annually toured series of events in which the best freeskiers and snowboard freeriders compete for individual event wins, as well as the overall title of World Champion in their respective genders and disciplines. The events take place on what's commonly referred to as "backcountry", "big mountain" or "extreme" terrain – essentially ungroomed powder snow on dangerously steep, mountainous slopes.

The first event series under the Freeride World Tour moniker took place in 2008. Prior to that it was known as the Verbier Extreme, originally a snowboard only contest launched in 1996 – with skiers also invited to compete in 2004. For the 2013 season, the Freeride World Tour merged with the Freeskiing World Tour and The North Face Masters of Snowboarding, combining all three tours under one unified global 5-star championship series.

The Freeride World Qualifiers are a tour of open and ranked entry competitions that give the Freeride World Tour new rookies for each season. As freeriding has become more popular the Freeride Junior Tour has had many competitions all over the world as well as an invite only Freeride Junior World Championships annually since 2012.

The International Ski and Snowboard Federation bought the Freeride World Tour in 2022.

World tour locations

Main events

Freeride World Tour qualifiers 

 2010 

  Jasna Adrenalin
  Roldal Freeride Challenge
  New Zealand Challenge
  North Face Masters Snowbird
  Freeride de Flaine
  Engadinsnow
  Masters Crystal Mountain
  Big Mountain Fieberbrunn 
  El Dorado Freeride
  Mystic Experience Monte Rosa
  Masters Kirkwood
  Freeride Battle Kanin
  Freeride Ch'ships Taos
  Nendaz Freeride

2011

  Scott Czech Ride
  Roldal Freeride Challenge
  Scandinavian Big Mountain Riksgränsen
  NZ Freeski Open
  K2 Big Mountain
  Export 33 Mt Ruapehu
  La Clusaz Radical Mountain
  Jasna Adrenalin
  Stimorol Engadin Snow
  Big Mountain Hochfuegen

2012

  NZ Freeski Open
  K2 Big Mountain
  La Clusaz Radical Mountain
  Big Mountain Hochfügen
  T-Bar Freesession Morgins
  El Dorado Freeride
  First Track Freeride Chandolin
  Kick the Vick Ecofreeride
  Nendaz Freeride
  X-Over Ride Kaprun
  Freeride Khibiny Cup
  Arctix Tamok
  CNF Romania

 2013 

 27/11-02/12 Sheregirls 2* Siberia, Russia
 09-10/01 La Clusaz Radikal Mountain 2* La Clusaz, France – 2 Events 
 12-13/01 La Clusaz Radikal Mountain 4* La Clusaz, France 
 12-13/01 Open Faces Axamer Lizum 2* Axamer Lizum, Austria 
 14-19/01 Verbier Freeride Week 2* Verbier, Switzerland – 6 Events 
 19-20/01 Open Faces Fieberbrunn 2* Fieberbrunn, Austria 
 26-27/01 Open Faces Hochkönig 1* Hochkönig, Austria 
 30-02/01 Engadinsnow 4* Silvaplana Corvatsch, Switzerland 
 02-03/02 Open Faces Kappl 2* Kappl, Austria 
 06-07/02 Subaru Freeride Series 2* Crested Butte, CO USA ( Ski only ) 
 07-10/02 Subaru Freeride Series 4* Crested Butte, CO USA ( Ski only ) 
 08-10/02 Ukrainian Freeride Masters 2* Mts. Hoverla & Breskul, Ukraine  
 09-11/02 Bigmountain Hochfuegen 4* Hochfuegen, Austria 
 13-14/02 The North Face Masters 2* Alpine Meadows, CA USA ( Snowboard only ) 
 14-17/02 The North Face Masters 4* Squaw Valley, CA USA ( Snowboard only ) 
 16-17/02 T-Bar Free-session powered by Dakine 2* Morgins, Switzerland 
 21-22/02 El Dorado Freeride 1* Arcalis and Valnord, Andora 
 23-24/02 El Dorado Freeride 4* Arcalis and Valnord, Andora 
 22-24/02 Open Faces Stubai 3* Stubai, Austria 
 28-03/02 Salomon Extreme Freeride Championships 4* Taos, NM USA 
 28-02/02 Pitztal Wild Face 1* Pitztal, Austria 
 01-03/03 Mad Goat Ride 2* Bansko, Bulgaria 
 01-03/03 Bigmountain Goldeck 2* Goldeck, Austria 
 07-09/03 Castle Freeski 3* Castle Mountain, AB, Canada ( Ski only ) 
 08-10/03 Freeride Battle 2* Kanin, Slovenia 
 09-10/03 First Track Freeride St Luc Chandolin 3* Chandolin, Switzerland 
 14-18/03 Subaru Freeride Series 4* Moonlight Basin, MT USA ( Ski only ) 
 16-17/03 The Coe Cup 1* Glencoe Mountain, Scotland 
 16-18/03 Nendaz Freeride 4* Nendaz, Switzerland 
 22-24/03 Weekend Warrior Tour 2* Winter Park, CO USA 
 23-24/03 X Over Ride Kitzsteinhorn 3* Kitzsteinhorn Kaprun, Austria 
 04-07/04 Khibiny Open Cup 1* Kukisvumchorr, Russia 
 10-11/04 Subaru Freeride Series 2* Snowbird, UT USA ( Ski only ) 
 11-14/04 Subaru Freeride Series 4* Snowbird, UT USA ( Ski only ) 
 13-14/04 CNF Romania 3* Balea-Lac, Fagaras Mountains, Romania 

 2015 

 24-Apr-14	27-Apr-14	Roldal	NOR
 1-Sep-14	8-Sep-14	The Remarkables/Treble Cone	NZL
 15-Sep-14	20-Sep-14	Mt Ruapehu	NZL
 10-Jan-15	11-Jan-15	Verbier	SUI
 10-Jan-15	11-Jan-15	Axamer Lizum	AUT
 12-Jan-15	13-Jan-15	Verbier	SUI
 14-Jan-15	15-Jan-15	Verbier	SUI
 17-Jan-15	18-Jan-15	Verbier	SUI
 17-Jan-15	18-Jan-15	Artesina	ITA
 17-Jan-15	18-Jan-15	Kappl-Paznaun	AUT
 24-Jan-15	27-Jan-15	Hochfuegen	AUT
 24-Jan-15	25-Jan-15	Hochkar	AUT
 30-Jan-15	2-Jan-15	Grand Targhee	USA
 31-Jan-15	31-Jan-15	Ste Foy	FRA
 1-Feb-15	1-Feb-15	Chamonix FRA
 2-Feb-15	5-Feb-15	Livigno	ITA
 5-Feb-15	8 Dec 2015	Silvaplana Corvatsch	SUI
 7-Feb-15	8-Feb-15	Les Arcs	FRA
 14-Feb-15	16-Feb-15	Crested Butte Mountain Resort	USA
 19-Feb-15	22-Feb-15	Sogndal	NOR
 19-Feb-15	22-Feb-15	Morgins	SUI
 20-Feb-15	22-Feb-15	Goldeck	AUT
 21-Feb-15	21-Feb-15	Mad River Glen	USA
 27-Feb-15	2 Mar 2015	Jasna	SVK
 27-Feb-15	1 Mar 2015	Pitztal	AUT
 27-Feb-15	1 Mar 2015	Taos	USA
 28-Feb-15	28-Feb-15	Magic Mountain	USA
 1 March 2015	2 Mar 2015	Uttendorf-Weissee	AUT
 6 March 2015	9 Mar 2015	Val D'Aran	ESP
 6 March 2015	8 Mar 2015	Snowbird Mountain Resort	USA
 7 March 2015	8 Mar 2015	Silvrettra Montafon	AUT
 7 March 2015	7 Mar 2015	Sugarbush	USA
 7 March 2015	8 Mar 2015	Chandolin	SUI
 8 March 2015	8 Mar 2015	Smugglers Notch	USA
 10 March 2015	12 Mar 2015	Crystal Mountain Resort	USA
 12 March 2015	15 Mar 2015	Stavanger/Hunnedalen	NOR
 14 March 2015	14 Mar 2015	Sugarloaf	USA
 14 March 2015	15 Mar 2015	Glencoe Mountain	GBR
 14 March 2015	15 Mar 2015	Nendaz	SUI
 20 March 2015	22 Mar 2015	Sauda	NOR
 21 March 2015	22 Mar 2015	Obergurg-Hochgurgl	AUT
 21 March 2015	22 Mar 2015	Jay Peak	USA
 21 March 2015	21 Mar 2015	Tignes	FRA
 27 March 2015	28 Mar 2015	Kicking Horse	USA
 28 March 2015	29 Mar 2015	Kitzsteinhorn Kaprun	AUT
 23 April 2015	26 Apr 2015	Roldal	NOR

 2016 
 1 September 2015 – 6 September 2015 The Remarkables NZL 
 1 September 2015 – 6 September 2015 The Remarkables NZL 
 4 September 2015 – 5 September 2015 Los Penintentes ARG
 23 April 2015 – 26 April 2015 Roldal NOR

World tour winners 

 After Freeride World Tour 2020

See also 
 Extreme skiing

References

External links
 the official Free Ride World Tour homepage

Snowboarding competitions
Sports competition series
Recurring sporting events established in 2008
Skiing world competitions